Stettinius v. United States, 22 F. Cas. 1322 (C.C.D.C. 1839), was a decision of the United States Circuit Court of the District of Columbia that was handed down in November 1839. It reversed the conviction of a defendant for unlawfully passing paper currency because the indictment did not properly aver, and the verdict did not properly find that the notes he had allegedly passed were indeed paper currency.

The defendant argued that he should be allowed to offer his construction of the law to the jury as an alternative to the trial court's interpretation. That prompted a detailed review by the Circuit Court of the law regarding jury nullification. The court concluded that while parties may argue a point of law to the jury before the court has ruled on it, they have no right to do so afterward.

US Attorney Francis Scott Key argued the case for the government.

References

External links
HTML of the decision

United States circuit court cases
Jury nullification
1839 in United States case law